Collett (also spelled Collet) is a Norwegian family of English origin, descended from English-born merchant James Collett (born 1655 in London, died 1727 in Christiania), who settled in Christiania in 1683. He married Karen Leuch, and died as the richest man in the city. The firm he founded, Collett & Leuch, later renamed Collett & Søn (Collett & Son), was continued for four generations until 1821. The family became part of the patriciate of Christiania in the 18th century. His descendants continued to play important roles in Norwegian history and owned several properties, such as Buskerud Manor, Store Ullevål Manor, Flateby, Økern Manor and Firma Albert Collett. One of the most well-known family members are statesman and First Minister Jonas Collett.

A Danish branch of the family is descended from Bernt Anker Collet, and uses the spelling Collet. They own the estates of Lundbygård and Katholm Castle, and formerly owned Rønnebæksholm.

Famous members
 Albert Collett (1842–1896), owner of Firma Albert Collett and Buskerud Manor
 Alf Collett (1844-1919), genealogist
 Axel Collett (1880–1968), co-owner of Firma Albert Collett
 Bernt Anker Collet (1803–1857), owner of Lundbygård
 Bernt Johan Collet (1941–), owner of Lundbygård, Danish Minister of Defense and chamberlain
 Brita Collett Paus (1917-1998), humanitarian
 Camilla Collett (née Wergeland, 1813–1895), writer, often referred to as Norway's first feminist
 Frederik Collett (1839–1914), painter
 James Collett (1655–1727), merchant
 Johan Collett (1775–1827), statesman
 John Collett (1758–1810), businessman
 John Collett (1807–1891), landowner
 Jonas Collett (1772–1851), statesman
 Mathia Collett (1737-1801), businesswoman, wife of Norway's then wealthiest person
 Mathias Collett (1708-1759), governor
 Peter Collett (1766–1836), supreme court justice
 Peter Jonas Collett (1813-1851), jurist
 Robert Collett (1842–1913), zoologist

Literature
 Alf Collett: En gammel Christiania-Slægt. Familien Collett og Christianias Fortid, Christiania 1888
 Fotolitografisk Gjengivelse af det i Storthingets Arkiv opbevarede Original-Haandskrift af Kongeriget Norges Grundlov af 17.de Mai 1814 (viser eidsvollsmannens segl med slektsvåpenet)
Haagen Krog Steffens: Norske Slægter 1912, Gyldendalske Boghandel, Kristiania 1911
 Hugo Høgdahl: Norske ex libris og andre bokeiermerker. Fra biskop Arne Sigurdsson til Gerhard Munthe, Oslo 1946, side 79-81 (Peter Colletts ex libris)
Hans Cappelen: «Norske Serafimerridderes våpenskjold», Heraldisk Tidsskrift, bind 2, side 234-235, København 1965-1969 (Jonas Colletts våpenplate i Riddarholmskyrkan, Stockholm)
 Hans Cappelen: Norske slektsvåpen, Oslo 1969 (2. opplag 1976), p. 82
Herman Leopoldus Løvenskiold: Heraldisk nøkkel, Oslo 1978
 Harald Nissen og Monica Aase: Segl i Universitetsbiblioteket i Trondheim, Trondheim 1990, side 49

References

External links
 «Mulighetenes land?», Norsk Folkemuseum exhibition on immigrants to Norway

 
Danish families
Norwegian families
Norwegian people of English descent
European families of English ancestry